Alexander Selecký (born 8 October 2002) is a Slovak professional footballer who currently plays for Fortuna Liga club Ružomberok as a defender.

Club career

MFK Ružomberok
Selecký made his Fortuna Liga debut for MFK Ružomberok against FK Senica on 24 July 2021. He played the entire match.

References

External links
 MFK Ružomberok official club profile 
 
 Futbalnet profile 
 

2002 births
Living people
People from Banská Bystrica District
Sportspeople from the Banská Bystrica Region
Slovak footballers
Slovakia youth international footballers
Association football defenders
MFK Ružomberok players
Slovak Super Liga players